MassBank may refer to:
 MassBank Corp., a corporation bought by Eastern Bank, a bank in Massachusetts, United States
 MassBank (database), a mass spectral database described at mass spectrometry software